Asonomaso is a town in the Ashanti Region of Ghana located in Kwabre East District. Asonomaso is about 27 kilometers northeast of Kumasi

See also
 Adanwomase

References

External links 
Ghanaexpeditions.com

Populated places in the Ashanti Region